Ferredoxin 2 is a protein that in humans is encoded by the FDX2 gene. It participates in heme A synthesis and iron-sulphur protein synthesis.

Mutations in FDX2 cause mitochondrial myopathy.

References

Further reading